The Feast of the Blessed Sacrament is an annual four-day Portuguese cultural festival held at Madeira Field in New Bedford, Massachusetts. It is recognized as the largest festival of Portuguese culture in the world and the largest ethnic festival in New England. It is organized by the Clube Madeirense S.S. Sacramento.

History 
The festival was founded in 1915 by four immigrants from Madeira, both to recreate religious festivals from their homeland and to celebrate their safe arrival in the United States.

Traditions 
A traditional Mass is held in honor of the Blessed Sacrament at Our Lady of Immaculate Conception Church, but most people come for the parade, live music, folk dancing, kids activities, amusement park rides, and food and drink. The Feast also has Madeira wine imported in casks from Madeira through an agreement with the Madeiran government.

Food 
Escabeche de atum, carne de espeto, linguiça, bacalhau, and carne de vinha d'alhos are some of the popular dishes sold at the festival.

Miscellaneous 
Governor of Massachusetts Charlie Baker described the event as an "all-time favorite" and lamented the cancellation of the 106th annual festival due to the COVID-19 pandemic.

References 

Events in Massachusetts
New Bedford, Massachusetts
Portuguese culture
Portuguese cuisine
Madeira Island